Aaron Kuhl (born 30 January 1996) is an English semi-professional footballer who plays for National League side Dorking Wanderers as a midfielder. He was a member of the Reading academy and made his debut for the club before loan spells with Dundee United in Scotland during 2015, and with Boreham Wood in 2016. He has represented England at under-19 and under-20 level.

Early life
Kuhl was born in Paulton. His father is the former professional footballer Martin Kuhl. He attended Yateley School in Hampshire.

Club career
Kuhl joined Reading academy in 2008. In December 2013, he signed his first professional contract. After impressing for Under-21s in their run to winning 2013–14 Under-21 Premier League Cup, Kuhl gathered interested from the beaten finalist, Manchester City.

On 19 August 2014, Kuhl made his professional debut as a half-time substitute in a Championship fixture against Huddersfield Town.

During July 2015, Kuhl joined RCD Mallorca on trial with a view to a season-long loan deal with the Spanish Segunda División side.

On 1 September 2015, Kuhl joined Scottish Premiership club Dundee United on loan until January 2016. On 14 December 2015, Kuhl returned to Reading early from his loan deal with Dundee United.

On 9 May 2016, Kuhl was one of 15 Reading youth-team players offered a new contract by the club, with confirmation of his new deal being signed coming on 1 July 2016.

On 19 August 2016, Kuhl signed for National League club Boreham Wood on loan until 28 January 2017, but the deal ended early as Kuhl was recalled at the beginning of January.

After Reading announced that Kuhl would be leaving the club upon the completion of his contract, Kuhl joined Icelandic club Stjarnan on trial at the end of June, before similar stints with Bracknell Town and Aldershot Town. Whilst on trial with Aldershot Town, Kuhl injured his left knee, rupturing his Medial collateral ligament in a friendly against Wycombe Wanderers.

In October 2019, Basingstoke Town announced the signing of Kuhl on a short-term contract following a successful trial after a long injury lay-off.

On 15 November 2019, National League South side Slough Town announced the signing of Kuhl. He joined Hartley Wintney on loan in December 2019.

On 30 January 2023, Kuhl signed for National League club Dorking Wanderers.

International career
On 17 March 2015, Kuhl was called up to the England under-19 squad for the first time, making his debut in their 1–0 victory over Azerbaijan on 28 March.

Kuhl received his first England under-20 call up in August 2015, for the team's friendly matches against the Czech Republic on 5 and 7 September 2015, making his debut in their 5–0 victory on 5 September.

Career statistics

Honours

Club
Reading
 U22 Premier League Cup (1): 2013–14

References

External links
 
 
England profile at The Football Association

Living people
1996 births
People from Paulton
English footballers
England youth international footballers
Association football midfielders
Reading F.C. players
Dundee United F.C. players
English Football League players
Scottish Professional Football League players
National League (English football) players
Southern Football League players
Boreham Wood F.C. players
Basingstoke Town F.C. players
Slough Town F.C. players
Hartley Wintney F.C. players
Dorking Wanderers F.C. players